Trolley may refer to:

Vehicles and components
 Tram, or trolley or streetcar, a rail vehicle that runs on tramway tracks
 Trolleybus, or trolley, an electric bus drawing power from overhead wires using trolley poles
 Trolleytruck, a trolleybus-like vehicle used for carrying cargo
 Tourist trolley, a rubber-tired bus designed to resemble an old-style streetcar or tram
 Trolley (horse-drawn), a goods vehicle with four wheels of equal size mounted underneath it 
 Rail push trolley, a small vehicle for inspecting rail lines

Tools
 Airline service trolley, a small serving cart used by flight attendants inside an aircraft
 Boat dolly, or trolley, a device for launching small boats into the water
 Creeper (tool), a low-profile, wheeled platform used by auto mechanics
 Flatbed trolley, or dray, for freight transport in distribution environments
 Piano trolley, a device for moving pianos
 Golf trolley, a trolley designed for carrying a golf equipment
 Laptop charging trolley, a device for charging mobile computers
 Shopping cart, or trolley, a wheeled cart used by customers while shopping
 Stretcher, an apparatus used for moving patients who require medical care

Other uses
 Trolley station (UTA), a light rail station in Salt Lake City, Utah, U.S.
 San Diego Trolley, a light rail system in San Diego, California, U.S.
 Trolley (TV series), a 2022 South Korean television series

See also

 
 
 Baby transport
 Dolly
 Food cart
 Hand truck
 Serving cart
 Trolley problem, a thought experiment in ethics
 Trolley Station (disambiguation)